Randy “Boom Boom” Blake (born November 25, 1986) is an American kickboxer who competes in the cruiserweight and heavyweight divisions. Known for his speed and kicking ability, he began his martial arts training in karate at the age of seven before turning to kickboxing. He initially gained recognition fighting in the World Combat League, then went on the win and dominate the Xtreme Fighting League's Light heavyweight Kickboxing Championship with numerous title defenses. Blake won the ISKA World Heavyweight Muay Thai title in 2012 before going on to compete in K-1 and Glory.

Early life
Randy Blake moved from Cleveland, Ohio to Owasso, Oklahoma with his family at an early age. Inspired by the film Bloodsport, he began training in karate aged seven and received his black belt from former world kickboxing champion Dale Cook in 2003 at 16. He is currently a fourth degree black belt. He also played basketball for Tulsa Community College.

Career

Early career (2007–2012)
Blake began fighting as an amateur kickboxer in 2007 and first gained recognition while competing for the Oklahoma Destroyers during the 2007–08 season of the World Combat League. Fighting in the -88 kg/195 lb division, he debuted against the Texas Dragons' Freddie Espiricueta and stopped his opponent with two successive spinning back kicks to the body, earning him the nickname "Boom Boom".

After amassing a 2–1 record in the WCL, Blake went on to become a mainstay in the Oklahoma-based Xtreme Fighting League promotion, where he won the XFL Light heavyweight (-93 kg/205 lb) Kickboxing Championship. Going undefeated as a professional at 20–0, he earned himself a shot at the vacant ISKA World Heavyweight (-96.4 kg/212 lb) Muay Thai Championship on June 21, 2012 in his hometown of Tulsa, Oklahoma against Mike Sheppard, the man who previously defeated him in the WCL. During the fight, Blake repeatedly controlled Sheppard's head in the clinch and scored with knees which opened a cut on his opponents face. This caused the fight to be stopped in the fifth round, and Randy Blake was crowned the new champion.

K-1 (2012)
Following this world title win, Blake was recruited by K-1, historically the world's premier kickboxing organization. In his promotional debut, he headlined the card at the K-1 World Grand Prix 2012 in Los Angeles on September 8, 2012 against veteran Dewey Cooper with a place at the 2012 K-1 World Grand Prix at stake. He outpointed Cooper over three rounds, winning by unanimous decision and advancing to the K-1 World Grand Prix 2012 in Tokyo Final 16 on October 14, 2012, where he was drawn against eventual champion Mirko Cro Cop. Blake was given a standing eight count in the second round despite claiming a low blow from a Cro Cop front kick, but scored a controversial knockdown of his own in round three. Cro Cop attempted an uppercut on Blake after a slip but when trying to apologize, Blake sucker punched him to the canvas. Despite this, he simply did not have the power to hurt the Croatian and was outfought to a majority decision loss, the first of his career.

He rebounded from his first defeat less than a month later, knocking out fellow K-1 veteran Deutsch Pu'u with a third round high kick at Xtreme Fight Night 10 in Tulsa on November 16, 2012.

Glory (2013–2014)
Blake fought in an eight-man -95 kg/209 lb tournament as part of the "Road to Glory" series, qualifiers for the Glory promotion, at Xtreme Fight Night 11 in Tulsa on February 1, 2013. Despite entering the tournament as the favourite, he was upset at the quarter-final stage by Dustin Jacoby, a mixed martial artist and late entrant to the competition. In round three, he was caught with a punch while lunging in which hurt him and allowed Jacoby to capitalize and force the referee to call a halt to the bout. He was scheduled to face Manuel Quezada at Xtreme Fight Night 12 in Tulsa on April 12, 2013. However, Quezada was replaced by the lesser-known Jason Broom who Blake feat via technical knockout in the second.

Despite losing out in the "Road to Glory" tournament, Blake was still given his chance in the promotion and debuted at Glory 9: New York in New York City, New York on June 22, 2013 against Koichi in a reserve match for the -95 kg/209 lb tournament. He spent the six weeks leading up to the fight training at Golden Glory Breda in Breda, Netherlands and defeated his Japanese opponent by unanimous decision. In his sophomore Glory appearance, Blake lost to Brian Collette by unanimous decision at Glory 10: Los Angeles in Ontario, California on September 28, 2013.

Following this, Blake returned to the XFL promotion in Oklahoma where he scored three consecutive wins over Roy Boughton, Wayman Carter and Joe Yager, respectively, between November 2013 and January 2014. In his return to Glory, Blake replaced the injured Brian Collette to face Mourad Bouzidi at Glory 15: Istanbul in Istanbul, Turkey on April 12, 2014. He again spent time at a different camp in the lead up to the fight, training with the Blackzilians in Boca Raton, Florida where his sparring partners included Anthony Johnson, Thiago Silva and Tyrone Spong. Blake lost to Bouzidi via a lopsided unanimous decision and was docked two points in the match for excessive clinching.

Blake defeated Warren Thompson via unanimous decision (30-26, 30–26, 30-26) at Glory 18: Oklahoma on November 7, 2014.

Subsequent career (2015–)
Blake defended his XFL title against Lucas Overcast, Brian McVea, Tony Lopez, Aundre Groce, Zach Gerullis, Demoreo Dennis and Evan Nedd.

Personal life
Blake and his partner have a daughter Rogue Marcella (born 2021).

Championships and awards

Kickboxing
International Sport Karate Association
ISKA World Heavyweight (-96.4 kg/212 lb) Muay Thai Championship
Xtreme Fighting League
XFL Heavyweight Kickboxing Championship
XFL Light heavyweight (-93 kg/205 lb) Kickboxing Championship

Kickboxing record

|-
|-  bgcolor="#FFBBBB"
| 2021-06-18 || Loss ||align=left| Rob Morrow || Xtreme Fight Night 371 || Tulsa, Oklahoma, US || Decision (split) || 5 || 3:00 ||
|-
! style=background:white colspan=9 |
|-
|-
|-  bgcolor="#FFBBBB"
| 2020-08-07 || Loss ||align=left| Rob Morrow || Xtreme Fight Night 367 || Tulsa, Oklahoma, US || Decision (split) || 4 || 3:00 ||
|-
! style=background:white colspan=9 |
|-
|-  bgcolor="#CCFFCC"
| 2020-08-07 || Win ||align=left| Eric Lunsford || Xtreme Fight Night 367 || Tulsa, Oklahoma, US || Decision (unanimous) || 3 || 3:00 ||
|-
! style=background:white colspan=9 |
|-
|-  bgcolor="#CCFFCC"
| 2019-02-01 || Win ||align=left| Evan Nedd || Xtreme Fight Night 356 || Tulsa, Oklahoma, US || Decision (unanimous) || 3 || 3:00 || 39-4
|-
! style=background:white colspan=9 |
|-
|-  bgcolor="#CCFFCC"
| 2018-11-30 || Win ||align=left| Demoreo Dennis || Xtreme Fight Night 353 || Tulsa, Oklahoma, US || Decision (unanimous) || 3 || 3:00 || 38-4
|-
! style=background:white colspan=9 |
|-
|-  bgcolor="#CCFFCC"
| 2018-04-06 || Win ||align=left| Manuel Mancha || Xtreme Fight Night 347 || Tulsa, Oklahoma, US || TKO || 4 ||  ||
|-
! style=background:white colspan=9 |
|-
|-  bgcolor="#CCFFCC"
| 2017-06-16 || Win ||align=left| Zach Gerullis || Xtreme Fight Night 342 || Tulsa, Oklahoma, US || KO || ||  || 37-4
|-
! style=background:white colspan=9 |
|-
|-  bgcolor="#CCFFCC"
| 2016-06-17 || Win ||align=left| Aundre Groce || Xtreme Fight Night 29 || Tulsa, Oklahoma, US || Decision (Unanimous) || 5 || 3:00  || 36-4
|-
! style=background:white colspan=9 |
|-
|-  bgcolor="#CCFFCC"
| 2016-02-05 || Win ||align=left| Tony Lopez || Xtreme Fight Night 27 || Tulsa, Oklahoma, US || TKO || 1 || 1:57  || 35-4
|-
! style=background:white colspan=9 |
|-
|-  bgcolor="#CCFFCC"
| 2015-06-05 || Win ||align=left| Bryan McVea || Xtreme Fight Night 23 || Tulsa, Oklahoma, US || TKO || 3 || 1:53 || 34-4
|-
! style=background:white colspan=9 |
|-  bgcolor="#CCFFCC"
| 2015-02-06 || Win ||align=left| Lucas Overcast || Xtreme Fight Night 22 || Tulsa, Oklahoma, US || TKO || 2 ||  || 33-4
|-
! style=background:white colspan=9 |
|-  bgcolor="#CCFFCC"
| 2014-11-07 || Win ||align=left| Warren Thompson || Glory 18: Oklahoma || Shawnee, Oklahoma, US || Decision (unanimous) || 3 || 3:00 || 32-4
|-  bgcolor="#CCFFCC"
| 2014-08-01 || Win ||align=left| Marcus Sursa || Xtreme Fight Night 20 || Tulsa, Oklahoma, US || Decision (unanimous) || 3 || 3:00 || 31-4
|-  bgcolor="#FFBBBB"
| 2014-04-12 || Loss ||align=left| Mourad Bouzidi || Glory 15: Istanbul || Istanbul, Turkey || Decision (unanimous) || 3 || 3:00 || 30-4
|-  bgcolor="#CCFFCC"
| 2014-01-31 || Win ||align=left| Joe Yager || Xtreme Fight Night 17 || Tulsa, Oklahoma, US || Decision (unanimous) || 3 || 3:00 || 30-3
|-  bgcolor="#CCFFCC"
| 2014-01-18 || Win ||align=left| Wayman Carter || Xtreme Fight Night 16 || Shawnee, Oklahoma, US || KO (punch to the body) || || || 29-3
|-  bgcolor="#CCFFCC"
| 2013-11-08 || Win ||align=left| Roy Boughton || Xtreme Fight Night 15 || Tulsa, Oklahoma, US || KO (high kick) || 2 || 2:58 || 28-3
|-  bgcolor="#FFBBBB"
| 2013-09-28 || Loss ||align=left| Brian Collette || Glory 10: Los Angeles || Ontario, California, US || Decision (unanimous) || 3 || 3:00 || 27-3
|-  bgcolor="#CCFFCC"
| 2013-06-22 || Win ||align=left| Koichi || Glory 9: New York - 95 kg Slam Tournament, Reserve Match || New York City, New York, US || Decision (unanimous) || 3 || 3:00 || 27-2
|-  bgcolor="#CCFFCC"
| 2013-04-12 || Win ||align=left| Jason Broom || Xtreme Fight Night 12 || Tulsa, Oklahoma, US || TKO || 2 || || 26-2
|-  bgcolor="#FFBBBB"
| 2013-02-01 || Loss ||align=left| Dustin Jacoby || Xtreme Fight Night 11 Road to Glory USA 95 kg Tournament, Quarter Finals || Tulsa, Oklahoma, US || TKO (punches) || 3 || 1:43 || 25-2
|-  bgcolor="#CCFFCC"
| 2012-11-16 || Win ||align=left| Deutsch Pu'u || Xtreme Fight Night 10 || Tulsa, Oklahoma, US || TKO (high kick) || 3 || 0:38 || 25-1
|-  bgcolor="#FFBBBB"
| 2012-10-14 || Loss ||align=left| Mirko Cro Cop || K-1 World Grand Prix 2012 in Tokyo Final 16, First Round || Tokyo, Japan ||Decision (majority) || 3 || 3:00 || 24-1
|-  bgcolor="#CCFFCC"
| 2012-09-08 || Win ||align=left| Dewey Cooper || K-1 World Grand Prix 2012 in Los Angeles || Los Angeles, California, US || Decision (unanimous) || 3 || 3:00 || 24-0
|-  bgcolor="#CCFFCC"
| 2012-06-01 || Win ||align=left| Mike Sheppard || Xtreme Fight Night 7 || Tulsa, Oklahoma, US || TKO (cut) || 5 || 0:21 || 
|-
! style=background:white colspan=9 |
|-  bgcolor="#CCFFCC"
| 2011-11-18 || Win ||align=left| Marvin Eastman || Xtreme Fight Night 5 || Tulsa, Oklahoma, US || KO (punches) || 1 || || 
|-
! style=background:white colspan=9 |
|-  bgcolor="#CCFFCC"
| 2011-08-26 || Win ||align=left| Chris Bell || Xtreme Fight Night 4 || Tulsa, Oklahoma, US || KO || 1 || 1:09 || 
|-
! style=background:white colspan=9 |
|-  bgcolor="#CCFFCC"
| 2011-05-13 || Win ||align=left| Myron Dennis || Xtreme Fight Night 3 || Tulsa, Oklahoma, US || KO (punches and right knee) || 4 || || 
|-
! style=background:white colspan=9 |
|-  bgcolor="#CCFFCC"
| 2011-02-25 || Win ||align=left| Myron Dennis || Xtreme Fight Night 2 || Tulsa, Oklahoma, US || Decision (split) || 5 || 3:00 || 
|-
! style=background:white colspan=9 |
|-  bgcolor="#CCFFCC"
| 2010-07-30 || Win ||align=left| Chris Bell || XFL: Rumble on the River 1 || Tulsa, Oklahoma, US || Decision (unanimous) || 5 || 3:00 || 
|-
! style=background:white colspan=9 |
|-  bgcolor="#CCFFCC"
| 2010-06-25 || Win ||align=left| Ryan Lopez || Xtreme Fighting League || Tulsa, Oklahoma, US || KO (punches) || 1 || 1:03 || 
|-  bgcolor="#CCFFCC"
| 2010-03-06 || Win ||align=left| Casey Rich || XFL: March Badness || Bixby, Oklahoma, US || KO (right high kick and right cross) || 1 || 0:31 || 
|-  bgcolor="#CCFFCC"
| 2009-06-12 || Win ||align=left| Brandon Gaines || XFL: Bad Intentions || Tulsa, Oklahoma, US || Decision (unanimous) || 3 || 3:00 || 
|-  bgcolor="#CCFFCC"
| 2009-03-06 || Win ||align=left| Eric Braly || XFL: Collision Course || Tulsa, Oklahoma, US || KO (right hook) || 3 || || 
|-

|-
|-  bgcolor="#CCFFCC"
| 2008-05-03 || Win ||align=left| Adrian Bio || World Combat League || San Antonio, Texas, US || Decision || 2 || 3:00
|-  bgcolor="#FFBBBB"
| 2008-02-23 || Loss ||align=left| Mike Sheppard || World Combat League || Tulsa, Oklahoma, US || Decision || 2 || 3:00 
|-  bgcolor="#CCFFCC"
| 2008-00-00 || Win ||align=left| Freddie Espiricueta || World Combat League || United States || KO (spinning back kick) || 1 || 
|-
| colspan=9 | Legend:

Professional boxing record 

| style="text-align:center;" colspan="8"|2 Wins (2 knockouts, 0 decisions),  1 Loss, 0 Draws
|-  style="text-align:center; background:#e3e3e3;"
|  style="border-style:none none solid solid; "|Res.
|  style="border-style:none none solid solid; "|Record
|  style="border-style:none none solid solid; "|Opponent
|  style="border-style:none none solid solid; "|Type
|  style="border-style:none none solid solid; "|Rd., Time
|  style="border-style:none none solid solid; "|Date
|  style="border-style:none none solid solid; "|Location
|  style="border-style:none none solid solid; "|Notes
|- align=center
|Loss
| 2–1
|align=left| Nick Jones
|
|
| 
|align=left|
|align=left|
|- align=center
|Win
| 2–0
|align=left| Arthur Parker
|
|
| 
|align=left|
|align=left|
|- align=center
|Win
| 1–0
|align=left| Chester Burton	
|
|
| 
|align=left|
|align=left|
|- align=center

Mixed martial arts record

|-
| Win
| align=center| 1–0
| Rudy Sylvester Lindsey
| Decision (unanimous)
| XFL – Xtreme Fighting League
| 
| align=center| 3
| align=center| 3:00
| Miami, Oklahoma, United States
|
|-

References

External links
 Official K-1 profile
 Official Glory profile
 

Living people
1986 births
Tulsa Community College alumni
American male kickboxers
Kickboxers from Ohio
Kickboxers from Oklahoma
Cruiserweight kickboxers
Heavyweight kickboxers
American male mixed martial artists
Mixed martial artists utilizing karate
Mixed martial artists utilizing Brazilian jiu-jitsu
Mixed martial artists from Ohio
Mixed martial artists from Oklahoma
Heavyweight mixed martial artists
American male karateka
American practitioners of Brazilian jiu-jitsu
African-American sportsmen
Sportspeople from Cleveland
People from Owasso, Oklahoma
Sportspeople from Tulsa, Oklahoma
21st-century African-American sportspeople
20th-century African-American people